Keith Charles Frederick Weed  (born 1961) is Unilever's former CMCO. The CMCO is responsible for the marketing and communications functions, and in this role, he led Unilever's sustainability agenda and the Unilever corporate brand. He held this position from 2010 to 2019. Before this he was Unilever's head of global home care and hygiene.

Education 
Weed obtained a Bachelor of Engineering with First Class Honours from Liverpool University in 1983.
In 2012 he was awarded an Honorary Doctorate from Southampton Solent University recognising his contributions to business.

Career 
Weed worked as an engineer after graduating university before joining Unilever in 1983 as a marketer. 
Throughout his career at Unilever, he has been chairman of Lever Fabergé and chairman of Unilever Export. He has worked for Unilever in the UK, France, the United States, both in global and regional roles across general management and marketing.
In 2012 he was global head of Home Care & Hygiene.
As Unilever's Chief Marketing and Communications Officer, Weed is on Unilever's executive board with the Marketing, Communications and Sustainable Business teams reporting to him.

Since becoming CMCO, Weed has pioneered new ways of integrating sustainability in business and led the creation of a "sustainable living plan". This plan seeks to grow Unilever, reduce its environmental footprint, and increase its social impact. He also dissolved Unilever's corporate social responsibility department and has integrated sustainable growth throughout Unilever's business. In 2014, Weed gave a TED Talk about the global issue of climate change and argues that sustainability and economic growth can go hand-in-hand.

Weed has also directed significant advances in digital and influencer marketing and technologies within Unilever. He championed the 3Vs of Viewability, Verification and Value across the industry. He is committed to tackling stereotypes – gender and beyond – in advertising through Unilever's #Unstereotype initiative. As a part of this initiative, he architected the Unstereotype Alliance. Weed co-created this alliance with the help of UN Women, and united 24 companies in an effort to remove the portrayal of unhelpful stereotypes from their advertising by 2020.

In 2016 Weed was LinkedIn's second most influential writer on the platform in the UK.

In 2017, he was voted as the Marketers' Marketer of the Year by Campaign readers. He was also voted Global Marketer of the Year 2017 by the World Federation of Advertisers.

Weed was named the World's Most Influential CMO in 2017 and 2018 by Forbes.

In 2018, Weed also received The Drum's Lifetime Achievement Award and featured in the Top 50 Financial Times heroes list as a Champion of Women in Business.

Outside Unilever, Weed worked as the president of the Advertising Association, a fellow of The Marketing Society, of which he was president from 2003 to 2006, and is a fellow of the Institute of Mechanical Engineers.  He was a non-executive director of Sun Products Corporation from 2008 to 2016. He is currently chairman of Business in the Community International, a board of trustees director for Business in the Community, a board director of the Effies. and a trustee of Grange Park Opera.

In 2020, Weed was appointed the president of the Royal Horticultural Society

Weed was appointed Commander of the Order of the British Empire (CBE) in the 2021 New Year Honours for services to the advertising and marketing industry.

References

Alumni of the University of Liverpool
Unilever people
British marketing people
Chief marketing officers
Living people
Commanders of the Order of the British Empire
1961 births